This article provides details of international football games played by the Comoros national football team from 2020 to present.

Results

2020

2021

2022

Forthcoming fixtures
The following matches are scheduled:

Head to head records

References

2020s in the Comoros
2020